Madam Boss (Born Tarisai Cleopatra Chikocho) is a Zimbabwean comedy socialite, music artist and actress.

Early background
Madam Boss was born in Harare in 1985. She grew up in Madziva village in Zimbabwe.

Career
Madam Boss started her career as a gospel music artist when she released her debut album titled Sunungura. She became prominent as a comedian socialite when she started doing comedy skits as a maid which circulated on social media. She become the first Zimbabwean comedian to reach 1 million followers on Facebook. In 2021 she began an acting career when she was cast in a Nollywood series titled The Offspring. She was then cast for a role in South Africa’s SABC 1 drama series Ubettina Wethu. In July 2021, it was announced that Madam Boss was to act in a South African-produced Netflix film called The Bad Bishop.

She is the brand ambassador of RwandAir as well as other corporates which include Net*One, Nyaradzo Group and Ingwebu Breweries.

Awards
Social Media Brand of the year - Zimbabwe Business Awards 2017
Socialite of the year - Zimbabwe Social Media Awards 2018
People's Choice - Zimbabwe International Women Awards 2018
Women Of The Year Award In Digital And Social Media - Zimbabwe National Women’s Awards 2018
Influencer of the Year - Zimbabwe Achievers Awards 2021 (nominated)
E! Entertainment People's Choice Awards - African Social Star winner 2021

Personal life
She is married to Ngonidzaishe Munetsiwa since 2021.

References

Living people
Zimbabwean comedians
1985 births